The 2012 Motorpoint British Supersport Championship Protected By Datatag season was the 25th running of the British Supersport Championship, the rules have stayed as they were from last year with the two race format providing some intense racing. With champion Alastair Seeley leaving for the British Superbike Championship the field should be closer than ever, Ben Wilson stays to see if he can finally capture the title. It proved to be another closely thought championship with Jack Kennedy and the returning former Supersport champion Glen Richards battling all the way to the final race of the championship, where it was down to the second and final race, in a drama packed race Richards fell at westfield on lap 2, meaning Kennedy only needed to finish to win the title, but on lap 8 Kennedy's dreams were ended with a mechanical problem for his MARtrain Yamaha forcing him to retire and hand Richards the title who was unaware of the events until arriving back in the pits.

Calendar

Championship standings

Riders' Championship

Privateers' Championship

References

External links
 The official website of the British Supersport Championship

British
Supersport
British Supersport Championship